Malay Falls is a small rural community on the Eastern Shore of Nova Scotia, Canada, in the Halifax Regional Municipality. The community is located along East River, and is adjacent to the Malay Falls Flowage, a lake along the river's course. Malay Falls was first settled in 1784. Colin Malay acquired land here in 1849, when the area was called Salmon River. The Government of Canada maintains a weather station in the community.

Climate

References
Citations

Bibliography

Communities in Halifax, Nova Scotia
Meteorological stations
General Service Areas in Nova Scotia